Vajska (Serbian Cyrillic: Вајска) is a village in Serbia. It is situated in the Bač municipality, in the South Bačka District, Vojvodina province. Two neighbouring settlements, Labudnjača and Živa, are also officially regarded as parts of Vajska although they are physically separated from it. The name Labudnjača is derived .

Name
In Serbian the village is known as Vajska (Вајска), in Croatian as Vajska, in Hungarian as Vajszka or Józsefháza, in German as Wajska and in Romanian as Vaisca.

History
During the early stage of the Yugoslav Wars and following the Battle of Borovo Selo in neighbouring Croatia, Danube river link was established between Vajska and Borovo 4 of May 1991 which during its operation reportedly served between 10-30,000 passengers including Croat refugees leaving the village of Borovo.

Demographics
The population of the village numbered 2,834 people as of the 2011 census. In 2002, the population included 1,319 Serbs, 569 Romanians, 353 Croats, 341 Hungarians, 207 Yugoslavs, and others.

Historical population

1961: 4,355
1971: 3,798
1981: 3,448
1991: 3,272
2002: 3,169

Gallery

See also
List of places in Serbia
List of cities, towns and villages in Vojvodina

References

Slobodan Ćurčić, Broj stanovnika Vojvodine, Novi Sad, 1996.

Places in Bačka
Bač, Serbia
South Bačka District